Rhizotrogus aestivus is a species of brown coloured beetle in the Melolonthinae subfamily that can be found in Austria, France and Spain. It is also occurs in Czech Republic, Slovakia and Russia.

References

Beetles described in 1789
aestivus
Beetles of Europe